Karen Duggan (born 29 May 1991) is an Irish footballer who plays for Peamount United of the Women's National League (WNL). She has previously played for UCD Waves and the Republic of Ireland women's national football team. Between 2013 and 2016 Duggan was selected for the WNL Team of the Season for four successive seasons. She was the only player selected all four seasons. In 2015–16 she was also WNL Senior Player of the Season. Duggan has also played camogie at club, university and county level.

Early years
Duggan was born in Piltown, County Kilkenny. She is the daughter of Pat and Bernie Duggan and has an older brother, John. Between 2005 and 2009 Duggan attended Scoil Mhuire (Greenhills) in Carrick-on-Suir where she studied for her Leaving Cert. While there she played various sports including association football, camogie, Gaelic football and basketball. As a schoolgirl she also played association football for Piltown L.F.C. and began playing camogie with Piltown GAA. Duggan also played for Kilkenny GAA in the 2009 All-Ireland Minor Camogie Championship final.

Club career

University of Limerick
Between 2009 and 2013 Duggan attended the University of Limerick where she gained a 2.1 Honours Science Education Degree. She also qualified to become a science teacher. Together with Julie-Ann Russell, Duggan also played for the UL association football team that won the 2010 WSCAI Intervarsities Cup. They defeated a UCD team that featured Louise Quinn 2–1 in the final at Turners Cross. Duggan and Russell also helped the team win the WSCAI Premier Division in 2010–11. They also played for the UL ladies futsal team that won the 2011 WSCAI National Futsal Intervarsities title.
 
Duggan also represented UL at camogie, helping them win the 2010 Ashbourne Shield and then finish as runners up in the 2013 Ashbourne Cup. While a student at UL Duggan also played association football for Tramore in the Waterford Ladies League. In September 2010 Duggan scored twice for Tramore in a 3–0 win over Johnville in the Waterford Ladies Cup final. Tramore completed a double, having already won the league title.

Peamount United
Duggan, along with fellow UL student Julie-Ann Russell, began playing for Peamount United in 2011 and subsequently played for the club in their 2011–12 UEFA Women's Champions League campaign and during the inaugural 2011–12 Women's National League season. In her first season with the club, Duggan helped Peamount win both the league title and the WNL Cup. Duggan was also selected for the WNL Team of the Season in both 2012–13 and 2013–14. Between 2013 and 2014, while playing with Peamount United, Duggan was also employed as a science teacher at Scoil Chríost Rí in Portlaoise. She also helped coach the school's association football team.

UCD Waves
The 2014–15 Women's National League season saw former Peamount United manager, Eileen Gleeson take charge of UCD Waves. Duggan was one of a number of Peamount United players, including Julie-Ann Russell, Aine O'Gorman, Dora Gorman, Chloe Mustaki and Emily Cahill who all subsequently followed Gleeson to UCD Waves. While playing for UCD Waves, Duggan was selected for the WNL Team of the Season for a third and fourth time in 2014–15 and 2015–16. In 2015–16 she was also named WNL Senior Player of the Season. In November 2014 Duggan started working as a business analyst and management consultant for Accenture. In 2017 she was named in the WNL Team of the Season again. She played in the 2017 FAI Women's Cup final for UCD Waves at the Aviva Stadium, but they were upset 1–0 by Cork City.

Peamount United
Ahead of the 2018 Women's National League season, Duggan returned to Peamount United. In 2019 The Peas recaptured the League title for the first time since 2011–12. Duggan also played in Peamount's 2018 and 2019 FAI Women's Cup final defeats by Wexford Youths. In 2020 Duggan displayed good form, being named November Player of the Month as Peamount retained their WNL title. She also scored in the 2020 FAI Women's Cup Final as The Peas vanquished Cork City 6–0 at Tallaght Stadium. At the WNL Awards in December 2020, Duggan was named in the Team of the Season for a record sixth time and named Player of the Year for the second time.

International career
Duggan has represented the Republic of Ireland at under 15, under 17, under 19, university and senior level. In December 2011, Duggan was included in a Football Association of Ireland (FAI) scholarship programme for potential senior women's internationals.

Duggan made her senior debut at the 2013 Cyprus Cup, in a 1–0 win over South Africa. She also represented the Republic of Ireland in their 2015 FIFA Women's World Cup and UEFA Women's Euro 2017 qualifying campaigns. Duggan also represented Ireland at the 2013 Summer Universiade. At the FAI International Football Awards she was named 2016 Senior Women's International Player of the Year.

In September 2018 Duggan retired from international football after winning 35 caps, following Ireland's failed 2019 FIFA Women's World Cup qualifying campaign. She later declined an approach from her former Peamount and UCD coach Eileen Gleeson, who was named the incoming national team coach Vera Pauw's assistant, to resurrect her international career in the UEFA Women's Euro 2022 qualifiers.

Media career
Duggan was part of RTÉ Sport's punditry team for the UEFA Euro 2020, alongside Damien Duff, Liam Brady, Richie Sadlier and Kevin Doyle.

Honours

Association football
Individual
FAI International Football Awards Senior International Women's Player of the Year
2016
FAI International Football Awards Under-19 Women's International Player of the Year
 2008
Women's National League Senior Player of the Season
 2015–16, 2020
Women's National League Team of the Season 
 2012–13, 2013–14, 2014–15, 2015–16, 2017, 2020
Peamount United
 Women's National League
Winners: 2011–12, 2019, 2020: 3
Runners-up: 2012–13, 2013–14: 2
 WNL Cup
 Winners: 2012, 2013: 2
FAI Women's Cup
Winners: 2020: 1
Runners-up: 2012, 2018, 2019: 3
UCD Waves
Women's National League
Runners-up: 2014–15
FAI Women's Cup
Runners-up: 2014, 2017: 2
WNL Cup
Runners-up: 2016: 1
University of Limerick
WSCAI Premier Division 
 Winners: 2010–11 
WSCAI Intervarsities Cup
 Winners: 2010
WSCAI National Futsal Intervarsities 
 Winners: 2011

Camogie
Kilkenny GAA
All-Ireland Minor Camogie Championship
 Winners: 2009 
Piltown GAA
All-Ireland Intermediate Club Camogie Championship
 Winners: 2014–15
University of Limerick
Ashbourne Shield
 Winners: 2010
Ashbourne Cup
Runners-up: 2013

References

External links

1991 births
Living people
Alumni of the University of Limerick
Republic of Ireland women's association footballers
Republic of Ireland women's international footballers
Peamount United F.C. players
DLR Waves players
Women's National League (Ireland) players
Association footballers from County Kilkenny
Kilkenny camogie players
Irish schoolteachers
Republic of Ireland women's futsal players
Women's association football defenders
Women's association football midfielders
UL GAA camogie players
Republic of Ireland women's youth international footballers